Shatsky Lakes (Shatski Ozera) means "Lakes of Shatsk" in Ukrainian. It is a group of fresh water lakes located in northern Ukraine near the borders with Belarus and Poland, in the basin of the Bug river. The Shatsky Lakes are known for their clean, pure waters and views of the surrounding  forests. The largest and most famous lake is Svitiaz.

See also
 Shatsk National Natural Park

References

External links
 Explore Ukraine: Shatsky Lakes offer untouched forests, clear water
  UNESCO Biosphere Reserves Directory

Ramsar sites in Ukraine